ADAM metallopeptidase with thrombospondin type 1 motif, 17 is a protein that in humans is encoded by the ADAMTS17 gene.

Function 

This gene encodes a member of the ADAMTS (a disintegrin and metalloproteinase with thrombospondin motifs) protein family. ADAMTS family members share several distinct protein modules, including a propeptide region, a metalloproteinase domain, a disintegrin-like domain, and a thrombospondin type 1 (TS) motif. Individual members of this family differ in the number of C-terminal TS motifs, and some have unique C-terminal domains. The protein encoded by this gene has a high sequence similarity to the protein encoded by ADAMTS19, another family member. The function of this protein has not been determined. [provided by RefSeq, Jul 2008].

Clinical significance 
Mutations in ADAMTS17 are associated with Weill-Marchesani syndrome.

References

External links

Further reading 

 
 
 
 
 
 
 
 

ADAMTS